Joseph Ord Arthur (11 July 1891 – 1975) was an English professional footballer who played as a winger for Sunderland.

References

1891 births
1975 deaths
Footballers from South Shields
English footballers
Association football wingers
Sunderland A.F.C. players
South Shields F.C. (1974) players
Southport F.C. players
English Football League players